The 2016 Tim Hortons Brier, Canada's national men's curling championship, was held from March 5–13, 2016 at TD Place Arena in Ottawa, Ontario.

It is the fourth time the Brier has been held in Ottawa, and the fifth time the Brier has been held in the Ottawa-Gatineau region. It is the first time the Brier has been held in Ottawa since the 2001 Nokia Brier.

Alberta won the Brier 9–5 in the final against Newfoundland and Labrador, giving skip Kevin Koe his third Brier title. With the win, the Koe rink represented Canada at the 2016 World Men's Curling Championship held from April 2–10, 2016 at St. Jakobshalle in Basel, Switzerland. They also represented Team Canada at the 2017 Tim Hortons Brier in St. John's, Newfoundland and Labrador and earned $225,000 for the victory. The bronze medal game was won by Northern Ontario.

The total attendance for the event was 115,047, down from the 154,136 that went to the last Brier held in Ottawa. The attendance for the final was a sellout of 8,419, which was standing-room only in the 8,200 seat arena.

Ice conditions
Toward the end of the week, ice conditions became poor, as warmer, wet weather descended upon the capital, creating a layer of frost on the ice. The arena lacked a dehumidifier which made the problem worse, as there was no way of removing the moisture in the air. Manitoba skip Mike McEwen claimed the ice was the "second-worst ice conditions he's ever played on". Conditions returned to normal for the final championship weekend.

Teams
The 2016 Brier field has been considered by some to be among the best ever. The event features two Olympic champion skips, two World Champion skips, four Brier champion skips, and ten of the top 17 teams in the country (including six of the top ten in the world), according to the CTRS standings.

Coming off of a bronze medal showing at the 2015 Ford World Men's Curling Championship, the defending Brier champion Pat Simmons rink from Calgary returns to represent Team Canada. Also returning from the 2015 Brier is the 2010 World Champion Kevin Koe rink (also from Calgary), representing Alberta; 2014 Brier runner-up Jim Cotter representing British Columbia; 2006 Olympic Champion Brad Gushue and his Newfoundland and Labrador team;  the 2014 Olympic champions Brad Jacobs representing Northern Ontario; 2009 Canadian Junior Champion Adam Casey and his Prince Edward Island team; 2006 Brier champion Jean-Michel Ménard skipping the Quebec team; 2003 World Junior Champion Steve Laycock and his Saskatchewan team; ten-time Territories champion Jamie Koe, representing the Northwest Territories; and four-time Territorial Champion Bob Smallwood representing the Yukon. The 2016 Brier also features four-time provincial champion Mike Kennedy skipping New Brunswick; Three-time provincial champion Jamie Murphy representing Nova Scotia; and Four-time World Champion Glenn Howard, who is making his Brier record 17th appearance at the national championships. Two teams are making their debut at the 2016 Brier. The World #2 ranked Mike McEwen rink who lost in five of the last six provincial championship finals, finally won the Manitoba championship, earning the right to represent Manitoba for the first time at the Brier. Also making their debut is Team Nunavut, skipped by Wade Kingdon. Nunavut was granted a direct entry to the Brier for the first time in 2015, but opted to field a team for the first time in 2016.

For the first time, Curling Canada is allowing each team to field a player from out of province. Players living outside the province or territory of their team includes Brent Laing of Alberta (lives in Ontario), Chris Schille of the Northwest Territories (lives in Alberta) and Ryan Fry of Northern Ontario (who lives in Ontario, but in Toronto). Also, Team Canada skip Pat Simmons lives in Saskatchewan, while the rest of his team lives in Alberta.

CTRS ranking

Pre-qualifying tournament
The Northwest Territories rink won the pre-qualifying event, qualifying the team to play at the full Brier event round robin against the other 11 teams. Nova Scotia missed out in playing in the main event for the second straight year.

Standings
Final Standings

Results
All draw times are listed in Eastern Standard Time (UTC−5).

Draw 1
Thursday, March 3, 7:00 pm

Draw 2
Friday, March 4, 7:30 am

Draw 3

Friday, March 4, 4:20 pm

Pre-qualifying Final
Saturday, March 5, 2:30 pm

Round-robin standings
Final round-robin standings

Round-robin results
All draw times are listed in Eastern Standard Time (UTC−5).

Draw 1
Saturday, March 5, 2:30 pm

Draw 2
 
Saturday, March 5, 7:30 pm

Draw 3
Sunday, March 6, 9:00 am

Draw 4
Sunday, March 6, 2:00 pm

Draw 5
Sunday, March 6, 7:30 pm

Draw 6
Monday, March 7, 2:30 pm

Draw 7

Monday, March 7, 7:30 pm

Draw 8
Tuesday, March 8, 9:30 am

Draw 9
Tuesday, March 8, 2:30 pm

Draw 10
Tuesday, March 8, 7:30 pm

Draw 11
Wednesday, March 9, 9:30 am

Draw 12
Wednesday, March 9, 2:30 pm

Draw 13

Wednesday, March 9, 7:30 pm

With Northern Ontario's win over the Northwest Territories, they become the first team to clinch a playoff spot.

Draw 14
Thursday, March 10, 9:30 am

With their wins, both Alberta and Newfoundland and Labrador clinch playoff berths.

Draw 15
Thursday, March 10, 2:30 pm

Draw 16
Thursday, March 10, 7:30 pm

With Manitoba's win, they clinch the remaining playoff spot.

Draw 17
Friday, March 11, 9:30 am

With Prince Edward Island losing and Northwest Territories winning, PEI will be relegated into the pre-qualifying tournament at the 2017 Tim Hortons Brier, as they have finished last.

Playoffs

1 vs. 2
Friday, March 11, 7:30 pm

3 vs. 4
Saturday, March 12, 2:30 pm

Semifinal
Saturday, March 12, 7:30 pm

Bronze medal game
Sunday, March 13, 2:30 pm

Final
Sunday, March 13, 7:30 pm

Statistics

Player percentages
After Round Robin

Perfect games

Awards
The awards and all-star teams are listed as follows:

All-Star Teams
First Team
Skip:  Brad Jacobs, Northern Ontario
Third:  Ryan Fry, Northern Ontario
Second:  Brent Laing, Alberta
Lead:  Denni Neufeld, Manitoba

Second Team
Skip:  Brad Gushue, Newfoundland and Labrador
Third:  Mark Nichols, Newfoundland and Labrador
Second:  E.J. Harnden, Northern Ontario
Lead:  Ben Hebert, Alberta

Ross Harstone Sportsmanship Award
 Tyrel Griffith, British Columbia second

Paul McLean Award
Paul Wiecek, sports reporter for the Winnipeg Free Press

Hec Gervais Most Valuable Player Award
 Kevin Koe, Alberta skip

Notes

References

External links
 

 
Curling in Ottawa
2016 in Ontario
2016 in Canadian curling
The Brier
March 2016 sports events in Canada
2010s in Ottawa